Balbo may refer to:

Balbo (surname), including a list of people with the name
Balbo (aircraft formation), a large formation of aircraft

See also

Balbo's game, a chess variant invented by G. Balbo in 1974
Balbo sabretooth, a fish
Balbau, or Bal'bo, a village in the Astara Rayon of Azerbaijan